Blue Fire Lady is a 1977 Australian film directed by Ross Dimsey and starring Cathryn Harrison and Mark Holden. It was a rare children's film from producer Antony I. Ginnane who was better known for his horror and sex films.

Plot
Jenny Grey is a young girl who wants to be a competitive show rider but her father Alan doesn't approve, because his wife was killed in a riding accident. Jenny rides when she can and helps her neighbours deliver a foal. Alan sends Jenny off to boarding school in Melbourne to forget the idea but she rides whenever she can. When Jenny turns 18 she gets a job as a stable hand at Caulfield racetrack with the trainer Mr McIntyre and takes a room in a boarding house run by the caring Mrs Gianini, who also rents a room to Barry, a university student and mechanic. Jenny loves her job but frowns upon Mr McIntyre's seemingly uncaring treatment of his horses, namely when he works and races a horse with a sore leg, and sends the old stable dog to be put down. Jenny adopts the dog, whom Mrs G nicknames "Mr Dog", and soon a new horse arrives at the stables, a chestnut filly with a big blaze. The filly is the foal Jenny helped birth and has been given the name Blue Fire Lady. Lady is vicious toward the other stablehands but loves Jenny, who kindly begins to train her for the races as her rider and strapper. Meanwhile, she develops a romance with Barry, her house-mate.

Blue Fire Lady's first race is a disaster for Jenny. She asked the jockey to treat her kindly, but Mr McIntyre – who doesn't believe the filly has any potential – tells him to whip her hard. Blue Fire Lady wins but is traumatized and hurt from the race. Jenny quits her job and later finds out from her old stable colleague that Lady is too hard to handle and will be sent to auction. Jenny tries to bid at the auction for $100 but is outbid by a man from the slaughter yards who wants horses for dog food. Barry, unbeknownst to Jenny, drives out to see her estranged father and begs him to see how much Jenny loves horses.

At the auction Jenny is heartbroken when the dog food man wins Lady and cries by the stables. Barry comes in to find her and comfort her, and urges her to come outside. Confused, Jenny follows him, only to see her father handing a check to the dog man and Lady being loaded into a horse trailer. Her father smiles and hugs Jenny close, telling her he has bought Lady for her and he is sorry for not seeing her passion is for horses.

The film ends with a clip of Jenny and Blue Fire Lady competing in a show-jumping round and her proud father and Barry watching on as she wins and accepts her trophy.

Cast
 Cathryn Harrison as Jenny
 Mark Holden as Barry
 Peter Cummins as McIntyre
 Marion Edward as Mrs Gianini
 Lloyd Cunnington as Mr Grey
 Irene Hewitt as Mrs Bartlett
 Syd Conabere as Mr Bartlett
 Philip Barnard-Brown as Stephen
 Gary Waddell as Charlie
 John Wood (actor, born 1946) as Gus
 John Ewart as Mr Peters
 Rollo Roylance as reporter
 John Murphy as vet
 Telford Jackson as chief stewart
 Roy Higgins as Kelvin Clegg
 Bill Collins as broadcaster
 Jack Mobbs as postman

Production
Bob Maumill brought the script to Antony I. Ginnane who decided to make it. Ross Dimsey, who had written some sex films for Ginnane and had directed children in television commercials, was hired as director.

The film was funded entirely by private sources, coming from Filmways, the Nine network, Channel Seven in Perth and some private investors. Shooting took place in and around Melbourne over five weeks in August and September 1977 with race scene shot at Caulfied.

Release
The film enjoyed a reasonably successful run at the box office. By early 1979 Ginnane said the film had earned over $100,000 in foreign sales and he expected it would be profitable in a few more months.

References

External links
 
 Blue Fire Lady at Oz Movies

1977 films
Australian children's films
Films about horses
Films set in Victoria (Australia)
1970s English-language films